Remy & Papoose: Meet the Mackies is an American reality television series featuring Remy Ma and Papoose. The series premiered on October 1, 2018, on VH1 as a spin-off of Love & Hip Hop: New York.

Development
On December 18, 2017, Remy and Papoose starred in their own holiday special, Remy & Papoose: A Merry Mackie Holiday. On September 18, 2018, Page Six reported that Remy and Papoose would be starring in a three-week-event series, Remy & Papoose: Meet the Mackies, and released an exclusive first look clip. The show would make its series premiere on October 1, 2018.

Series synopsis

Overview and casting
Remy & Papoose: Meet the Mackies chronicles Remy and Papoose as they prepare for the birth of their first child together.

Remy and Papoose's family appear as supporting cast members in confessional interview segments throughout the series, including Papoose's children Shamele and Dejay, and Remy's son Jace. The season would also feature guest appearances from Remy's mother Amanda, Papoose's mother Irene, Remy's sisters Raemonique and Remeesha, Fat Joe, DJ Kay Slay and Remy and Papoose's Love & Hip Hop: New York co-stars Juju C., Yandy Smith, Maino, Safaree Samuels and Jaquáe.

Episodes

References

External links
 

Love & Hip Hop
2010s American reality television series
2018 American television series debuts
African-American reality television series
English-language television shows
Television shows set in New York City
Reality television spin-offs
VH1 original programming
American television spin-offs